Sylvia Young  (born 1939 in Hackney, London, England) is the founder and principal of Sylvia Young Theatre School in London, England.

Sylvia Young Theatre School

Young founded her theatre school in 1981 in Drury Lane, London, before moving to its current Marylebone premises in 1983. The school is co-educational and provides a combination of academic and vocational classes for children aged 10 to 16 years. The academic curriculum encompasses GCSEs, while the vocational curriculum teaches acting, dance and music.

Many SYTS students have gone on to become successful in the performing arts world, including Amy Winehouse; Denise Van Outen; Billie Piper; former Spice Girl Emma Bunton; Alex Rider star Alex Pettyfer; Isabel Hodgins; Kara Tointon; Lacey Turner; McFly member Tom Fletcher; Busted bassist Matt Willis; The Saturdays member Vanessa White; and The Wanted member Nathan Sykes. The film High School Musical 3 features an SYTS pupil, Jemma McKenzie-Brown.

Family

Young married Norman Ruffell in Hackney, London, in 1961 and has two children, actresses Frances Ruffelle and Alison Ruffelle. Young's granddaughter is pop singer Eliza Doolittle.

Styles and honours
She was the subject of This Is Your Life in December 1998 when she was surprised by Michael Aspel at the Sylvia Young Theatre School.

Young was appointed an Officer of the Order of the British Empire (OBE) in the Queen's Birthday Honours List of 2005 for her services to the arts.

References

1939 births
Living people
Officers of the Order of the British Empire
Sylvia Young Theatre School